was a Japanese animator, director and storyboarder. He started working at Shin-Ei Animation, later became part of Animaruya and then he became affiliated with Kyoto Animation.

Career
When he was young, Kigami was a big fan of Disney movies and anime shows based on the manga series of Osamu Tezuka, and this lead him to becoming an animator. He started working at Shin-Ei Animation before joining Kyoto Animation. Kigami became well known in the industry for his work on Grave of the Fireflies and Akira as a key animator. In 2003, Kigami directed his first work, Munto, and later became an instructor at Kyoto Animation's teaching program. In Kyoto Animation productions, he used the pen name Ichirou Miyoshi (三好一郎) when storyboarding, and Fumio Tada (多田文男) when doing key animation.

Death
On 18 July 2019, during the Kyoto Animation arson attack, Kigami was killed alongside 35 of his colleagues, with 33 others wounded; Kigami was initially declared missing after the attack due to his mother declaring that he could not be contacted immediately following the fire. His death was confirmed on 2 August 2019.

Filmography
Grave of the Fireflies: Key Animation
Cat's Eye: Key Animation (4 episodes)
Akira: Key Animation
Doraemon (7 movies): Key Animation
Robotan: Episode director (ep 5)Lucky Star: Animation Director (ep 18)Clannad: Animation Director (ep 3); Key Animation (ep 12, ep 23, ep 24)Love, Chunibyo & Other Delusions: Episode Director (ep 6); Storyboard ep (ep 6)Crayon Shin Chan Movies (1; 3;7;9) : Key AnimationHyouka: Key Animation; Storyboard (ep 5); Episode Director (ep 5)K-On!: Key Animation (ep 10, ep 12)K-On! Movie: Key AnimationMunto: DirectorTamako Market: Episode Director (ep 2, ep 9), Storyboard (ep 9), Key Animation (ep 1)Violet Evergarden: Episode Director (ep 6), Storyboard (ep 6)Nichijou: Episode Director (ep 6, ep 14, ep 20), Storyboard (ep 6, ep 14, ep 20)Air: Storyboard (ep 11), Episode Director (ep 11)Free!: Key AnimationFull Metal Panic? Fumoffu: Storyboard (ep 3, ep 7), Episode Director (ep 3, ep 7)Full Metal Panic! The Second Raid: Storyboard (ep 4, ep 8, ep 12), Episode Director (ep 4, ep 12)Sound! Euphonium: Episode Director (ep 5, ep 12)Baja no Studio: DirectorA Silent Voice'': Key Animation

See also
List of solved missing person cases
List of unsolved murders

References

External links

1957 births
2010s missing person cases
2019 deaths
Anime directors
Deaths from fire in Japan
Formerly missing people
Japanese animated film directors
Japanese animators
Japanese film directors
Japanese murder victims
Japanese television directors
Kyoto Animation people
Male murder victims
Missing person cases in Japan
People from Osaka Prefecture
People murdered in Kyoto
Place of birth missing
Victims of the Kyoto Animation arson attack
Akira (franchise)